is a retired Nippon Professional Baseball catcher. He used to play for the Yokohama BayStars.

References

External links

1968 births
Baseball people from Tokyo
Japanese baseball coaches
Japanese expatriate baseball players in the United States
Living people
Nippon Professional Baseball coaches
San Jose Bees players
Seibu Lions players
Yokohama BayStars players
Yokohama Taiyō Whales players